Grissom is a surname.

People bearing it include:

 Barry Grissom (born 1954), a former U.S. Attorney
 Clayton Holmes Grissom (born 1978), American pop singer Clay Aiken, made famous by American Idol
 David Grissom (fl. from 1978), American session guitarist
 Gus Grissom (1926–1967), the second American astronaut to fly in space; killed in the Apollo 1 accident
 Lee Grissom (1907-1998), a former left-handed pitcher in Major League Baseball, active 1934-1941
 Marquis Grissom (born 1967), a former Major League Baseball player; currently coach for the Washington Nationals
 Marv Grissom (1918-2005), a former pitcher in Major League Baseball
 Steve Grissom (born 1963), a NASCAR Busch Series driver and the 1993 Busch Series champion
 Vaughn Grissom (born 2001), American baseball player

Fictional characters
 Carl Grissom, a character and crimelord in Batman
 Gil Grissom of CSI: Crime Scene Investigation
 Cyrus Grissom of  Con Air